We Are the In Crowd is an American rock band from Poughkeepsie, New York, formed in 2009. The band consists of Taylor Jardine, Jordan Eckes, Mike Ferri, Rob Chianelli, and Cameron Hurley. They released their debut EP, Guaranteed To Disagree, on June 8, 2010, and followed it up with their first full-length album, Best Intentions in 2011. Their second full-length album, Weird Kids, was released on February 18, 2014. The band announced a hiatus in February 2016. They have since performed their first shows in 6 years at Slam Dunk Festival 2021.

History

In April 2009, We Are the In Crowd's Myspace page was hacked. The hacker was an ex-member of the band and deleted all of their friends and music. The music site Absolutepunk.net posted a news article regarding the hacking, and the news post attracted the attention of someone at Hopeless Records who contacted the band shortly after. Jardine made a video on YouTube  announcing the hack.

On November 10, 2009, the group announced their signing with Hopeless Records as "The In Crowd" and released their first single "For the Win" on iTunes. The band changed their name to "We Are the In Crowd" due to trademark issues with a reggae band from the seventies who were also called "The In Crowd".

In February 2010, We Are the In Crowd recorded their debut Hopeless Records EP with producers Zack Odom and Kenneth Mount (All Time Low, Mayday Parade, Jimmy Eat World, Cartel). The EP, titled Guaranteed To Disagree, was released on June 8, 2010.

We Are the In Crowd entered the studio in early May 2011 to begin recording their full-length debut. On August 3, 2011 it was announced the album would be titled Best Intentions, with a release date of October 4. It debuted on the U.S. Billboard 200 at No. 122. The band regularly tours all year long with fellow bands such as All Time Low and Mayday Parade, and have appeared at Warped Tour in 2010 and 2012, and  festivals such as Leeds. In 2013, the band toured around much of the world, including the UK.

The band has announced via a Fuse video interview that they will be recording material for a new album to be released in the summer/fall of 2013. On August 20, 2013, they released their new single "Attention".

On the December 3, 2013, We Are the In Crowd announced that they would be releasing a new album entitled Weird Kids, set for release on the February 18, 2014. They also announced a UK tour in late January followed by a US tour. The second single from the album, "The Best Thing (That Never Happened)", was released on Spotify that same day, and due to the "overwhelming response" they released it on iTunes the same day, a few days early.

In August 2014 the band were announced as the support acts for British rock band Don Broco during their Kerrang! tour in February 2015.

In February 2015, Taylor Jardine made a video announcement confirming that the band would soon begin writing and recording their third full-length album.

On May 4, 2015, band members Mike Ferri, Cameron Hurley and Taylor Jardine all tweeted that the third full-length has been finished.

On February 10, 2016, Taylor Jardine announced the band were going on hiatus. During this hiatus, Jardine started performing under the name 'Sainte', with Cameron Hurley and Mike Ferri both involved creatively.

On October 21, 2019, the band tweeted a graphic image of themselves dressed up as cowboys riding a horse, hinting at a potential reunion in the near future. Two days later, that reunion was officially confirmed when it was announced that they would be playing at Slam Dunk Fest in the UK in 2020, before the coronavirus pandemic hit and Slam Dunk Fest had to be pushed back to September 2021.

Band members
 Taylor Jardine – lead and backing vocals, keyboards, violin (2009–present)
 Jordan Eckes – rhythm guitar, lead and backing vocals (2009–present)
 Cameron Hurley – lead guitar, backing vocals (2009–present)
 Mike Ferri – bass (2009–present)
 Rob Chianelli – drums (2009–present)

Discography

Studio albums

EPs
Guaranteed to Disagree (2010)

Singles

Music videos

Tours

References

American pop rock music groups
Hopeless Records artists
Musical groups established in 2007